Joseph Douglas "Joe" Dube (born February 15, 1944) is an American weightlifter,  world champion, Olympic Games medalist and strongman competitor. He won a bronze medal at the 1968 Summer Olympics, and set two world records in the clean and press the same year. As of 2022 he is still the last male American weightlifter to win the world title in weightlifting, which he achieved in 1969.

Dube took up weightlifting in 1958, together with his elder brother Virgil. He learned the technique by reading weightlifting magazines and talking to Paul Anderson and his coach Dick Smith. He stopped competing in 1972–1979 due to an injury to the left elbow. He won the America's Cup in Honolulu in 1980, and retired in January 1982. In 1996 he had a total hip replacement.

Between 1962 and 1996, Dube worked for an insurance company based in Jacksonville, Florida.

Dube in media
Dube was a guest of President Richard Nixon at the White House. He also appeared on The Tonight Show Starring Johnny Carson. He is briefly mentioned briefly in the novel The Book of Air and Shadows, whose fictional protagonist is said to have competed in the 1968 Olympics.

Dube is an accomplished artist and has work on display with the Art of the Olympians. He is a member of the  US Weightlifting Hall of Fame.

References

External links

1944 births
Living people
People from Calhoun County, Florida
Sportspeople from Florida
American male weightlifters
American strength athletes
Weightlifters at the 1968 Summer Olympics
Olympic bronze medalists for the United States in weightlifting
Medalists at the 1968 Summer Olympics
Pan American Games gold medalists for the United States
Pan American Games medalists in weightlifting
Weightlifters at the 1967 Pan American Games
World Weightlifting Championships medalists
Medalists at the 1967 Pan American Games
20th-century American people